Alexander Bonini (c. 1270 – 1314) was an Italian Franciscan philosopher, who became Minister General of the Order of Friars Minor.

He taught at the University of Paris. A prolific writer, he is now remembered most for his Tractatus de Usuris. It is especially notable for its subtle treatment of the pricing of contracts involving risks; for example it writes of life annuities, 'we see men and women twenty-five years old buying life annuities for a price such that within eight years they will receive their stake back; and although they may live less than those eight years, it is more probable (probabilius) that they will live twice that. Thus the buyer has in his favour what happens more frequently and is more probable.'

References

Bibliography

Alexander Bonini, Un traité de morale economique au XIVe siecle: Le tractatus de usuris de maitre Alexandre d'Alexandrie (1962) editor A.-M. Hamelin
 Alexandri de Alexandria, In Duodecim Aristotelis Metaphysicae Expositio Venice 1592.

External links
Franciscan Authors, 13th-18th Century: A Catalogue in Progress

1270s births
1314 deaths
Italian Friars Minor
Scholastic philosophers
13th-century Italian Roman Catholic theologians
Year of birth uncertain
Ministers General of the Order of Friars Minor
14th-century Italian Roman Catholic theologians
14th-century Italian writers
13th-century Latin writers
14th-century Latin writers
13th-century philosophers
14th-century philosophers